Ahn Dong-eun (born 1 October 1988) is a South Korean footballer who plays as defender for Goyang Hi FC in K League Challenge.

Career
Dong-eun applied to the 2010 and 2011 K League draft but wasn't selected by any team, and he joined Korea National League side Suwon FC.

He made his professional league debut in the opening match of 2013 K League Challenge against FC Anyang.

References

External links 

1988 births
Living people
Association football defenders
South Korean footballers
Suwon FC players
Goyang Zaicro FC players
Ansan Mugunghwa FC players
Korea National League players
K League 2 players